SouthWest Transit is a public transportation agency that is based in Eden Prairie, Minnesota. The agency was formed in 1986 when the southwest Minneapolis suburbs of Chaska, Chanhassen, and Eden Prairie chose to opt out of the Metropolitan Transit Commission transit system in accordance with Minnesota State Statutes. Under a joint powers agreement between the three cities, they created their own transit system, SouthWest Metro Transit.

Now known as SouthWest Transit, the agency continues to be the public transit agency for Chaska, Chanhassen, and Eden Prairie, as well as Carver. They currently offer service to and from Downtown Minneapolis, the University of Minnesota, Normandale Community College and Best Buy Headquarters.

Service

In addition to their regular service, SouthWest Transit also offers a number of seasonal services, including State Fair, Twins Express, Vikings Express, Gophers Express, Summer Adventures, select concerts, and more.

SouthWest Transit also operates an on-demand service, SW Prime. This service operates in the cities of Carver, Chanhassen, Chaska, Eden Prairie, and Victoria. Other regional transit providers provide similar services with the Metropolitan Council's Transit Link, Maple Grove Transit's My Ride, MVTA's Connect, Plymouth Metrolink's Click-And-Ride, and Metro Transit's microtransit pilot Metro Transit micro.

SouthWest Transit offered a dial-a-ride transit service in the 1990s that required riders to book a trip by phone several days in advance. The service had high rates of trip cancellations and customers no-showing. SW Prime was launched in July 2015 and allowed customers to book a ride by phone or via a smartphone app. The service was initially offered Monday through Friday, but it has since expanded to Saturdays as well. The service was expanded to medical rides in 2019. Some service is offered to select areas of Shakopee and I-494 strip. Prior to the COVID-19 pandemic, around 500 SW Prime rides were served a day. Ridership lowered during the pandemic and in January 2021 was roughly 50% of pre-pandemic ridership, but by June 2022 ridership was 94% of pre-pandemic numbers. SW Prime ridership rebounded faster than SouthWest Transit express ridership.

In 2004 SouthWest Transit was named Transit Agency of the Year by the American Public Transit Association.

During the COVID-19 pandemic, SouthWest Transit initially laid off 50% of its drivers but has since struggled to re-staff its workforce like transit agencies across the nation.

Routes 

Bold route number denotes an express route.

Park & Ride Facilities 

SouthWest Transit operates out of the following park-and-ride locations:

Southwest Station – Hwy 212 & Prairie Center Drive, Eden Prairie
SouthWest Village – Hwy 212 & Hwy 101, Chanhassen
Chanhassen Transit Station – 500 Market St., Chanhassen (next to the Chanhassen Dinner Theatre)
East Creek Station – Hwy 212 & Hwy 41, Chaska
Carver Station – Hwy 212 & Jonathan Carver Pkwy, Carver

Park and ride expansions
SouthWest Transit opened three new park & ride facilities near Highway 212. The first, SouthWest Village, is at County Road 101 and Highway 212 in Chanhassen. The second new park & ride is East Creek Station in Chaska. That facility was opened in early June 2008 at the southwest corner of Highway 212 and County Road 41. The third new park & ride is Chanhassen Transit Station opened in December 2011 and is located north of Highway 5, just next to the Chanhassen Dinner Theatres on Market St.

Due to near capacity issues, in 2007 the East Creek Station Park and Ride CMAQ (Congestion Mitigation and Air Quality – a federal program) grant submittal was approved for the construction of 450 park and ride stalls, a transit station and busway. The new 450 stalls are structured parking (a ramp), and the station includes passenger waiting areas along with vending and restroom facilities. The total project cost $7.8 million. Bidding for the construction of the ramp and station is expected to take place in the spring/summer of 2012, with construction beginning later in the summer/fall and an opening of the new facility in September 2013. SouthWest is also in discussion with private developers to develop approximately one acre of land currently set aside for future development use. Options for the site include office, neighborhood commercial, and day care.

Records 

Records of the SouthWest Transit Commission are available for research use. They consist of annual reports (1997–2005); management plans and budgets (1992–1993, 1995); oversight (1993–1994); and On the Move rider newsletter (2005).

External links 
SouthWest Transit's Official Website
2006 annual report (PDF)

See also 
Metro Transit (Minnesota)
Minnesota Valley Transit Authority
 List of bus transit systems in the United States

References 

1986 establishments in Minnesota
Bus transportation in Minnesota
Transportation in Minneapolis–Saint Paul
Transportation in Carver County, Minnesota
Transportation in Hennepin County, Minnesota
Chanhassen, Minnesota
Chaska, Minnesota